Mount Angeles is located just south of Port Angeles, Washington in the Olympic National Park. It is the highest peak in the Hurricane Ridge area. The summit, which offers panoramic views of the Strait of Juan de Fuca and many of the peaks of the interior Olympic Mountains can be climbed from the Klahane Ridge trail.

The southeast side of Mount Angeles drains into Morse Creek, thence into the Strait of Juan de Fuca a couple of miles east of Port Angeles. 
The northeast side of Mount Angeles drains into Ennis Creek, thence into Port Angeles Harbor.
The north and west sides of Mount Angeles drain into the South Branch of Little River, thence into the  Juan de Fuca Strait via the Elwha River, whose mouth is located in the Lower Elwha Indian Reservation, a few miles west of Port Angeles.

Climate
Mount Angeles is located in the marine west coast climate zone of western North America.  Most weather fronts originate in the Pacific Ocean, and travel northeast toward the Olympic Mountains. As fronts approach, they are forced upward by the peaks of the Olympic Range, causing them to drop their moisture in the form of rain or snowfall (Orographic lift). As a result, the Olympics experience high precipitation, especially during the winter months in the form of snowfall. During winter months, weather is usually cloudy, but, due to high pressure systems over the Pacific Ocean that intensify during summer months, there is often little or no cloud cover during the summer.

Geology

The Olympic Mountains are composed of obducted clastic wedge material and oceanic crust, primarily Eocene sandstone, turbidite, and basaltic oceanic crust. The mountains were sculpted during the Pleistocene era by erosion and glaciers advancing and retreating multiple times.

See also

 Olympic Mountains
 Geology of the Pacific Northwest
 Geography of Washington (state)

References

Gallery

External links 
 Mount Angeles weather: Mountain Forecast
 

Mountains of Washington (state)
Mountains of Clallam County, Washington
Olympic Mountains
Landforms of Olympic National Park